Eureka (often abbreviated as E!, or Σ!) is an intergovernmental organisation for research and development funding and coordination. Eureka is an open platform for international cooperation in innovation. Organisations and companies applying through Eureka programmes can access funding and support from national and regional ministries or agencies for their international R&D projects.

, Eureka has 43 full members, including the European Union (represented by the European Commission) and four associated members (Argentina, Chile, South Africa, and Singapore). All 27 EU Member States are also members of Eureka.

Eureka is not an EU research programme, but rather an intergovernmental organisation of national ministries or agencies, of which the EU is a member. Cooperation and synergy are sought between Eureka and the research activities of the EU proper, such as with European Union's Horizon 2020 and the European Research Area.

History

Founded in 1985 by prominent European political figures, Eureka has grown to one of the longest running European organisations dedicated to the financing of joint European R&D projects.

Foundation

Eureka was established with the "Paris Declaration" of July 17, 1985, and its principles are based on the later Hannover Declaration, subscribed by Ministers on November 6, 1985. The two main founders were former head of states François Mitterrand (France) and Helmut Kohl (Germany). Other important personalities involved were Hubert Curien, French ex-Minister of Research and former Chairman of the European Space Agency and Jacques Attali, adviser to François Mitterrand.

Briefly, it is about assuring the technological independence of Europe in the key domains of the future; encouraging, wherever possible, co-operation between European businesses and researchers; mobilising the necessary financial resources; accompanying the efforts of our enterprises by creating the necessary environment and supporting the unification of our internal markets.

There are numerous obstacles. Once the initial idea of Eureka was formulated, we were able to foresee the difficulties to be faced. But we know that each time we come together — for example to address high-energy physics, research into nuclear fusion, the development of an integrated space programme or the construction of crucial scientific equipment — our successes encourage us in the idea that we can work together in R&D areas close to industrial markets, despite the problems arising from the normal and legitimate competition between firms.

Structure

Chairs

Before 1989, Eureka chairmanship changed hands every six months. Since then, the chairmanship rotates every 1 July, for a period of one year.

Membership

Significant projects

Eureka projects are numbered, preceded by 'E! '.

 E! 45 helped to fund the Prometheus project for safer road vehicles, such as through autonomous driving with 745 million euros.
 E! 95 was a 730 million euros HDTV project, which created the HD-MAC standard for high definition television.
 E! 147 was a 93 million euros digital audio broadcasting project whose technologies went into Musicam, and which was used as the basis for MPEG-1 Layer II (MP2) and used in DAB (Digital Audio Broadcast), and ASPEC (Adaptive Spectral Perceptual Entropy Coding), which was used in a modified form in MP3 audio.
 E! 127 paid 3.8bn euros into the JESSI project (Joint European Submicron Silicon Initiative) whose goal was to regain ground lost to Asia and the US in microchips.
 E! 2551 cost 6.1 million euros for the integration of existing CAD/CAM programs under a common user interface, part of which was paid to Vero Software.
 E! 3674 is Information Technology for European Advancement (ITEA2), an industry-driven cooperative R & D programme for maintaining European leadership in software-intensive systems, with the project due to end in January 2014 having received 3.0bn euros. ITEA2 Projects notably include WellCom, OSAMI-E Open Source AMbient Intelligence) and Easy Interactions.
 E! 4986 AlienVault developed a security software called OSSIM (Open Source Security Information Management) that is now not only a reference in the field but also an essential component in modern cyber-wars. E! 4986 received 1.2 million euros.
 E! 3728 OMIM (MIMO) invented a new method of medical waste disposal. MIMO is safe for the environment and treats infectious waste by applying a combination of heat and pressure. This is an alternative to incineration methods that use fossil fuels. The project was an initiative between Spain, Portugal and Morocco. E! 3728 received 0.37 million euros.

Programmes 
The Eureka annual report describes the following programmes:

Eurostars

Eurostars is Eureka's flagship SME funding programme that supports R&D-performing SMEs (alongside other types of organisations) leading international project consortia. It is co-funded by 36 participating Eureka national funding bodies and the European Union Horizon 2020 framework programme.

Clusters

Clusters are long-term, strategically significant industrial initiatives. They usually have a large number of participants, and aim to develop inclusive technologies of importance for European competitiveness mainly in ICT, energy and more recently in the biotechnology and automation sectors. Eureka Clusters are known to have had a particular impact on the ability of the European microelectronics sector to compete with other continents.

Eureka Clusters are:
CELTIC NEXT: Telecommunications
EURIPIDES: Electronic packaging and smart systems
ITEA 3: Software-intensive systems
PENTA: Micro and nanoelectronics enabled systems and applications
EUROGIA2020: Low-carbon energy technologies
METALLURGY EUROPE: New metals 
SMART: Advance manufacturing programme

Network projects

Network projects is a flexible funding programme for all organisations collaborating on international R&D projects. It is open for applications all year, but there are also country-specific calls for projects launched frequently. These are sometimes thematic and can be for bilateral or multilateral collaborations.

Globalstars

Globalstars follows the same programme model as Network projects. Calls for projects are launched between Eureka countries and one non-Eureka country. In recent years, national funding ministries/ agencies from e.g. Brazil, India, Japan and Singapore have collaborated with Eureka using this programme.

InvestHorizon

InvestHorizon is the only Eureka programme that doesn't offer funding, but rather trainings, workshops and international events. It is a European Union-funded joint investment readiness programme in collaboration with Eureka that supports deep tech SMEs seeking Series A investment.

Umbrellas

Umbrellas no longer exist as Eureka programmes. Umbrellas were thematic networks within the Eureka framework focusing on a specific technology area or business sector. The main goal of an umbrella was to facilitate the generation of Eureka projects in its own target area.

Past Eureka Umbrellas:
Eureka Tourism (ended 30.06.2012)
Eureka build 2 (2010–2013)
EuroAgri Foodchain (2009–2013)
Pro-Factory (2007–2011)
E! SURF (2010–2015)
Eniwep (ended 1.2.2010)
Eulasnet II (ended 31.5.2010)
Logchain + (ended 21.2.2011)

References

Notes

External links

 
Intergovernmental organizations
International organisations based in Belgium
International scientific organizations based in Europe
Organizations established in 1985
Research and development organizations